Oregon Agricultural Experiment Station (OAES)
is affiliated with Oregon State University and  coordinates research at experiment stations in Oregon. It receives state funding and funding from contracts for its work. It has 11 branch stations. It was established in 1887 after passage of the Hatch Act of 1887 and began at Oregon Agricultural College in 1888. It publishes a station bulletin. It also produced films and public service announcements. Rural homemaking practices were studied when female researchers were added to the organization. Publication topics have included studies on soils, pests, and crops.

Edgar Grimm was the first director.

The first branch station opened in Union, Oregon in 1901. The historic Red Barn was built in 1914 at the experiment station in Union, Oregon.

Deinococcus radiodurans was discovered at the experiment station in Corvallis.

Branch experiment stations
Eastern Oregon Agricultural Research Center in Union 
Malheur Agricultural Experiment Station in Malheur
Southern Oregon Experiment Station
Hermiston Agricultural Research and Extension Center in Hermiston 
North Willamette Research & Extension Center in Aurora
Mid-Columbia Agricultural Research & Extension Center in Hood River
Columbia Basin Agricultural Research Center (CBARC) in Pendleton
Ontario
Southern Oregon Agricultural Experiment Station in Medford
 Eastern Oregon Agricultural Research Center in Burns
 Madras
Klamath Basin Research and Extension Center in Klamath Falls
Coastal Oregon Marine Experiment Station in Astoria
Portland, Food Innovation Center

Former
John Jacob Astor Experiment Station (closed 1972)
Harney Branch Station, (closed 1954)
Pendleton Experiment Station and Sherman Experiment Station  (merged to form CBARC)
Central Oregon Agricultural Research & Extension Center in Powell Butte, sold in 2018

References

Oregon State University
1887 establishments in Oregon
Agricultural research institutes in the United States
Research institutes in Oregon